The Storys were a Welsh rock band from Swansea, Wales, which formed in 2003. Their main influence was 1970s US West Coast bands in the country rock genre. The band currently consists of Steve Balsamo (vocals, guitar), Andy Collins (vocals, bass), Rob Thompson (vocals, guitar), Brian Thomas (drums, percussion), and Alan Thomas (keys, mandolin, banjo) and formerly included Dai Smith, who sang and played guitar until August 2008, when he left. He was replaced by Rosalie Deighton.

Conception (2003–2006)
The group featured four singer-songwriters all taking lead vocals on different songs. They count as inspirations such vocal harmony-based bands as Fleetwood Mac, The Eagles, Crosby, Stills, Nash and Young and The Beatles. 

They recorded their eponymous debut album The Storys in an old converted cinema in the Welsh Valleys and released the album themselves, setting up their own label – Hall Recordings – before signing a record deal with Warners and having their album re-released on Korova in March 2006.

Their first gig was to over 70,000 people at The Olympic Torch Concert outside Buckingham Palace, and was followed by a support slot with Tom Jones and a series of gigs in venues such as Bush Hall and The Borderline. The band also supported Elton John on two European tours.

2006–early 2008
Town Beyond The Trees, the band's second album, was released in 2008 on the band's own label, Hall Recordings, after Korova folded in 2007. It was recorded in Spring 2007 at Peter Gabriel's Real World studios near Bath, UK. The album was produced by Jon Kelly (Beautiful South, Kate Bush, Deacon Blue, Paul McCartney). It received favourable reviews from such publications as Maverick Magazine, Uncut Magazine, Classic Rock Magazine, Rock 'n' Reel Magazine etc. 

The band have also supported Santana (Switzerland), Celine Dion (Holland), Sinéad O'Connor (Belgium), Elton John (UK), Runrig (Germany) and Van Morrison (UK) as well as touring the UK in their own right.

Early 2008–2010
Dai Smith left the band in 2008 and was subsequently replaced by folk singer/songwriter, Rosalie Deighton.

The Storys' music was featured in the movie The Bank Job, and the band had cameo appearances in the film in the wedding scene. 

The Storys announced they were to split and play one final concert at the Swansea Grand Theatre on 19 June 2010.

Discography

Albums
The Storys (March 2006), Korova (previously released August 2005, Hall Recordings)
The Town Beyond the Trees (March 2008), Hall Recordings - UK #175

Singles and EPs
"I Believe in Love" (2006), Korova
"Cinnamon" (2006), Korova
"Be By Your Side" (2006), Korova
"Cinnamon" (2005), Hall Recordings
5 Track Promo Sampler (2005), Hall Recordings
The Storys EP (2005), Hall Recordings (approx. 100 copies only)
The Town Beyond the Trees EP (2005), Hall Recordings (60 copies only, limited edition artwork by Balsamo; 25 other copies had an old photo of Glyncorrwg printed on CD, plain plastic cover)

References

External links
 The Storys official website
 The Storys official Myspace
 The Storys biography from BBC Wales

Welsh rock music groups
Musical groups from Swansea
British country rock musical groups